Dichogama amabilis is a moth in the family Crambidae. It is found in Puerto Rico, Cuba and in southern Florida.

References

Moths described in 1889
Dichogamini